Greenwood, Virginia may refer to:
Greenwood, Albemarle County, Virginia
Greenwood, Bath County, Virginia